Meetings with Remarkable Men is a 1979 British biographical drama film directed by Peter Brook and based on the book of the same name by Greek-Armenian mystic, G. I. Gurdjieff, first published in English in 1963. Shot on location in Afghanistan (except for dance sequences, which were filmed in England), it starred Terence Stamp, and Dragan Maksimović as the adult Gurdjieff. The film was entered into the 29th Berlin International Film Festival, in competition for the Golden Bear award.

The plot involves Gurdjieff and his companions' search for truth in a series of dialogues and vignettes, much as in the book. Unlike the book, these result in a definite climax—Gurdjieff's initiation into the mysterious Sarmoung Brotherhood. The film is noteworthy for making public some glimpses of the Gurdjieff movements.

Selected cast
Dragan Maksimović as G. I. Gurdjieff
Terence Stamp as Prince Lubovedsky
Mikica Dimitrijevic as The young Gurdjieff
Warren Mitchell as Gurdjieff's father
Athol Fugard as Professor Skridlov
David Markham as Dean Borsh
Natasha Parry as Vitvitskaia
Colin Blakely as Tamil   
Grégoire Aslan as Armenian priest
Tom Fleming as Father Giovanni
Andrew Keir as Head of Sarmoung Monastery
Donald Sumpter as Pogossian
Gerry Sundquist as Karpenko
Martin Benson as Dr Ivanov 
Bruce Purchase as Father Maxim
Roger Lloyd-Pack as Pavlov

Further reading
 Meetings with Remarkable Men: my impressions of the film, by Kathryn Hulme. Remar Productions, 1979.
 Meetings with Remarkable Men: One man's search becomes a film, by Pamela Lyndon Travers.

References

External links

1979 films
1970s biographical drama films
Films directed by Peter Brook
Films shot at Pinewood Studios
Films based on books
Films shot in Afghanistan
Fourth Way
British biographical drama films
Films scored by Laurence Rosenthal
Films based on works by Armenian writers
Films based on biographies
1979 drama films
1970s English-language films
1970s British films